Lowood State High School is a high school located in Lowood, Queensland, Australia.

Established in 1983, the school serves students in grades 7 to 12, with an enrolment of about 700, as of 2003.

Notable persons
Tom Court, shotputter and international rugby union player.
Dane Sampson, Olympic sports shooter.

References

External links

Public high schools in Queensland
Educational institutions established in 1983
Buildings and structures in Somerset Region
1983 establishments in Australia